Mother Carey's Chickens may refer to:
Mother Carey's chickens, another common name of storm petrels
Mother Carey's Chickens (novel), a 1911 novel by Kate Douglas Wiggin
Mother Carey's Chickens (film), a 1938 drama film adaptation of the novel

See also
Mother Carey, personification of a cruel sea in folklore
Mother Carey's goose, an alternative name for a giant petrel